Midpoint 
is the third solo studio album by the English singer-songwriter Tom Chaplin. The album was released on 2 September 2022 by BMG.

Track listing

Charts

References

2022 albums
Tom Chaplin albums
BMG Rights Management albums
Albums recorded at The Church Studios